Callulina (commonly known as the warty frogs) is a small genus of frogs in the family Brevicipitidae with nine members in Tanzania and Kenya. Originally Callulina was thought to be monotypic and widely distributed through Eastern Arc Mountains in Tanzania and in southern Kenya. However, within the last decade eight new species has been identified, the majority of which are considered critically endangered by the International Union for Conservation of Nature (IUCN).

Species
Amphibian Species of the World lists nine Callulina species, most of which have been discovered within the last decade.
 Callulina dawida, Taita warty frog 
 Callulina hanseni, Hansen's warty frog 
 Callulina kanga, Krefft's secret frog 
 Callulina kisiwamsitu, Mazumbai warty frog
 Callulina kreffti, Krefft's warty frog
 Callulina laphami, Lapham's warty frog 
 Callulina meteora, Nguru warty frog
 Callulina shengena, Shengena warty frog
 Callulina stanleyi, Stanley's warty frog

References 

 
Brevicipitidae
Amphibians of Sub-Saharan Africa
Taxa named by Fritz Nieden
Amphibian genera